Thomas Ryan Bayu Hermawan (born 27 July 1991) is an Indonesian professional footballer

Club career

Persebaya Surabaya
Persebaya Surabaya recruited Thomas from Persela U-21 in 2010/2011 season. On 5 February 2012, Thomas made his competitive debut for Persebaya in the 2011–12 Liga Indonesia Premier Division against Persitara North Jakarta, which ended in a 2–0 victory at Gelora 10 November Stadium. A year later, Persebaya became champions of 2013 Liga Indonesia Premier Division  and promoted to Indonesia Super League.

Club statistics

Honours

Club
Persebaya Surabaya
 Liga Indonesia Premier Division: 2013

References

External links
 
 Player profil at ligaindonesia.co.id

1991 births
Living people
Indonesian footballers
Liga 1 (Indonesia) players
Persebaya Surabaya players
Association football goalkeepers